Michael Rabeson (born 26 October 1987) is a Malagasy football midfielder who plays for CNaPS Sport.

International career

International goals
Scores and results list Madagascar's goal tally first.

Honours 
CNaPS Sport
Winner
 THB Champions League (3): 2010, 2013, 2014

Runner-up
 THB Champions League: 2011

References

External links 
 

1987 births
Living people
Malagasy footballers
Madagascar international footballers
Association football midfielders
CNaPS Sport players